Clive Mark Rowe  (born 27 March 1964) is a British actor. He began his career in theatre, winning a Laurence Olivier Award. On television, he is known for his roles as in the CBBC series The Story of Tracy Beaker (2002–2005) and So Awkward (2015–2017), the BBC drama All the Small Things (2009), and the Disney series The Evermoor Chronicles (2014–2017).

Biography

Born in Oldham, Lancashire, Clive Rowe grew up in Shaw, Lancashire, in the parish of East Crompton and attended St. James Primary School and Crompton House School. As a teenager he was a member of Crompton Stage Society. He is a graduate of the Guildhall School of Music and Drama. Rowe has appeared in many pantomimes.

Television
Rowe has appeared on television in Dalziel and Pascoe and The Bill, and had a main role as "Duke" in The Story of Tracy Beaker in Series 1 to 4.

He appeared in the 2007 Christmas special of Doctor Who — "Voyage of the Damned" as "Morvin Van Hoff".

More recently, he appeared on the BBC1 drama All The Small Things, portraying "Clifford Beale", a homeless caretaker, more commonly known as "Shrek".

Rowe has also recently appeared in the show So Awkward on CBBC as the father of one of the main characters called Jas.

Film
His film roles include that of "Sammy" in Lars Von Trier's controversial Manderlay (2005). He appeared in the 2017 live-action remake of Beauty and the Beast as Cuisinier – the castle's head chef who has been transformed into a stove.

Theatre
While a student at the Guildhall School, Rowe played Wally Watkins in a production of Lady Be Good, which caused the Opera critic to note "one of two potential stars in the cast" who "sang the title song most winningly and rattled off the acres of daffy dialogue with the aplomb and timing of a Durante".
In 1992, Rowe was nominated for an Olivier Award for his performance as Enoch Snow in the London revival of Carousel. In 1994, he appeared in Once on This Island. He won the 1997 Olivier for Best Performance in a Supporting Role in a Musical for his role as "Nicely Nicely Johnson" in the National Theatre revival of Guys and Dolls. He was also nominated for an Olivier Award for his role in 2008’s Mother Goose at the Hackney Empire. He was called one of the best Dames in the business when he appeared on BBC One's Breakfast News on 10 December 2009. He starred in the pantomime Aladdin at the Hackney Empire from November 2009 to January 2010
and in Jack and the Beanstalk from November 2010.

He appeared as "Judas Iscariot" opposite Dave Willetts' "Jesus" in a touring version of Jesus Christ Superstar. He also voiced "Audrey 2" in the UK tour of Little Shop of Horrors. He frequently plays the Dame in the annual Christmas pantomime at the Hackney Empire. He also starred as the lion and Uncle Henry in a theatre production of The Wiz, a black version of The Wizard of Oz, in 2011.

In the summer of 2009, he appeared as the Jester "Feste" in Edward Dick's Regent's Park Open Air Theatre's production of Shakespeare's Twelfth Night.

In September and October 2011, Rowe played Osterberg, Monty Python's lawyer in Steve Thompson's "No Naughty Bits" at the Hampstead Theatre. In November 2011, Rowe played 'One-Round' in The Ladykillers at The Gielgud Theatre, London.

Rowe also played one of the debt collectors in The Old Vic's production of Kiss Me, Kate. He played this role in the winter of 2012/13. From mid-2013 to February 2014 Rowe played King Darius in Tori Amos's musical production of The Light Princess, at the Lyttelton Theatre (National). In the summer of 2018, he starred alongside comedian Matt Lucas in Chichester Festival Theatre’s Me and My Girl.

He toured in In the Willows, a modern, hip-hop retelling of the book of the same name. This show promotes equality by, for example, the incorporation of BSL into the choreography. Rowe plays Badger, teacher of a London state school. He was also in Sister Act as Eddie Souther.

Filmography

Film

Television

Himself
 Doctor Who Confidential .... Himself (1 episode, 2007)
 The Lesley Garrett Show .... Himself (2 episodes, 2001)

Archive footage
 Newsround, Episode dated 18 December 2007 (uncredited) .... Morvin Van Hoff

References

External links
 

BBC article about Doctor Who casting

1964 births
Living people
20th-century English male actors
21st-century English male actors
Alumni of the Guildhall School of Music and Drama
Black British male actors
English male stage actors
English male television actors
English people of Barbadian descent
Laurence Olivier Award winners
Male actors from Oldham
Members of the Order of the British Empire
Pantomime dames